László Berti (24 June 1875 – 23 June 1952) was a Hungarian fencer. He won a gold medal at the 1912 Summer Olympics and a silver and bronze at the 1924 Summer Olympics.

References

External links
 

1875 births
1952 deaths
Hungarian male sabre fencers
Olympic fencers of Hungary
Fencers at the 1912 Summer Olympics
Fencers at the 1924 Summer Olympics
Olympic gold medalists for Hungary
Olympic silver medalists for Hungary
Olympic bronze medalists for Hungary
Olympic medalists in fencing
Martial artists from Budapest
Medalists at the 1912 Summer Olympics
Medalists at the 1924 Summer Olympics
Hungarian male foil fencers
20th-century Hungarian people